Howie Kemp is a fictional character in the Ramona series of novels by Beverly Cleary.

Fictional character personality
Howard "Howie" Kemp is the curly-haired boy who lives right by Ramona. They are friends (mainly because their parents are friends) but sometimes they don't like each other. Howie is the polar opposite of Ramona. Ramona is imaginative and easily excited. Howie is analytical, literal, and never gets excited, which frustrates Ramona. When Ramona tells her class that workmen chopped a hole in their house in Ramona the Brave to make a new addition, Howie tells the class she is lying. His point is that the workmen pried off some siding and technically did not "chop a hole" in the house. Howie's parents think that he needs to be more creative. Ramona stayed at Howie's house and was baby-sat by his grandmother until Uncle Hobart teased her and Mrs. Kemp punished and blamed Ramona for not stopping Howie's sister Willa Jean from breaking the accordion that her son had given to Willa Jean.

Fictional biography
Howie has a fascination with tools and building things. Mr. Kemp regularly brings scrap wood home for Howie to build projects with. One time, Howie took a wheel off Ramona's tricycle to turn it into a bicycle, which pleased Ramona. In Ramona and Her Mother, Howie and Ramona made a boat out of scrap wood and tried to make it float in a tub of water. Ramona tried to make it blue by using some bluing liquid. While reaching for it, she spilled it all over both of them, much to Howie and his grandmother's dismay. He also made tin can stilts for both of them when Ramona told him that Mrs. Swink did that as a child. Howie has a younger sister and an unnamed older sister, who is mentioned in Ramona the Pest. The latter is only mentioned once, and might have been forgotten by Beverly Cleary. This character is most likely not considered canon by the author or fans of the books. True scholars are the only ones who acknowledge her existence. Howie's younger sister is Willa Jean Kemp.

Howie and Ramona like to play a game called Brick Factory, where they collect bricks from around the neighborhood and pound them to dust.

In third grade, Howie's Uncle Hobart marries Ramona's Aunt Beatrice, making the children cousins-in-law.

References 

Beverly Cleary characters
Child characters in literature
Male characters in literature
Literary characters introduced in 1955